Monodonta confusa is a species of sea snail, a marine gastropod mollusk in the family Trochidae, the top snails.

Description
The height of the shell attains 20 mm, its diameter 18 mm. This species is shaped like Monodonta labio. The color is pink, longitudinally clouded with dusky. The penultimate whorl bears 5 or 6, the last 13 or 14 spiral ridges. The second one from the suture is very narrow. The others are subequal, but become smaller beneath. There are no lirulae intercalated between the ridges on the last whorl, as is usually the case in Monodonta labio. And the ridges are very conspicuously and regularly cut into oblong subquadrangular or lozenge-shaped grains by vertical impressions as deep as the interliral groove. The basal tooth of the columella is smaller and more acute than in a typical Monodonta labio.

Distribution
This marine species occurs off Japan, Singapore and the Philippines.

References

 Donald K.M., Kennedy M. & Spencer H.G. (2005) The phylogeny and taxonomy of austral monodontine topshells (Mollusca: Gastropoda: Trochidae), inferred from DNA sequences. Molecular Phylogenetics and Evolution 37: 474-483.

External links
 To Biodiversity Heritage Library (5 publications)
 To Encyclopedia of Life
 To GenBank (2 nucleotides; 1 proteins)
 To World Register of Marine Species
 

confusa
Gastropods described in 1874
Marine gastropods